The Breakneck Stairs, or Breakneck Steps (French: Escalier casse-cou), is Quebec City's oldest stairway, built in 1635. Originally called escalier Champlain ("Champlain Stairs"), escalier du Quêteux ("Beggars' Stairs"), or escalier de la Basse-Ville ("Lower Town Stairs"), they were given their current name in the mid-19th century, because of their steepness. The stairs, which connect Côte de la Montagne in the "Upper Town" to the corner of Rue du Petit-Champlain and Rue Sous-le-Fort in the "Lower Town"), have been restored several times, including an 1889 renovation by Charles Baillargé, which converted the steps from a single flight into three parallel ones.

Several businesses are located on the western side of the steps at each of its four flights.

The steps through the years

References

Buildings and structures completed in 1635
Buildings and structures in Quebec City
Stairways
Tourist attractions in Quebec City
1635 establishments in the British Empire